Order of Merit and Management is an Iranian state expertise order established by "Council of Iran Ministers" in November 21, 1990. The order has three classes, and awarded by President of Iran. According to Article 9 of the Regulations on the Awarding of Government Orders of Iran, the Order of Merit and Management is awarded to people who achieve "an exceptional success in management, distinguished activities, aiding the oppressed and deprived people and/or beneficiary use of utilities and/or offering exquisite ways".

Recipients

Classes 
It comes in three classes:

See also 
 Order of Freedom (Iran)
 Order of Altruism
 Order of Work and Production
 Order of Research
 Order of Mehr
 Order of Justice (Iran)
 Order of Construction
 Order of Knowledge
 Order of Education and Pedagogy
 Order of Persian Politeness
 Order of Independence (Iran)
 Order of Service
 Order of Courage (Iran)
 Order of Culture and Art

References

External links 
 Iran Awarding of Government Orders website
 Types of Iran's Orders and their benefits (Persian)

CS1 uses Persian-language script (fa)
Awards established in 1990
Civil awards and decorations of Iran
1990 establishments in Iran
Orders of merit